The 2005 Champ Car Grand Prix of Cleveland was the fifth round of the 2005 Bridgestone Presents the Champ Car World Series Powered by Ford season, held on June 26, 2005 at Burke Lakefront Airport in Cleveland, Ohio. Due to the controversy at the 2005 United States Grand Prix at Indianapolis, any fan who had a ticket to the 2005 United States GP was granted free admission to this race.  Paul Tracy swept both the pole and the race win, his second victory of the season.

Qualifying results

Race

Caution flags

Notes

 New Race Record Paul Tracy 1:45:43.856
 Average Speed 108.755 mph

Championship standings after the race
Drivers' Championship standings

 Note: Only the top five positions are included.

References

External links
 Full Weekend Times & Results
 Friday Qualifying Results
 Saturday Qualifying Results
 Race Box Score

Cleveland
Cleveland Grand Prix
Grand Prix of Cleveland